The Lady in Red is a 1935 Warner Bros. Merrie Melodies cartoon, directed by Friz Freleng. The short was released on September 7, 1935.

The film score was composed by Bernard B. Brown and Norman Spencer. The two-strip Technicolor was credited on the reissue.

The cartoon follows the early custom of Warner Bros. cartoons in being built around (and thus pushing) a melody from the Warners catalog, in this case, a song called "The Lady in Red" from the 1935 Warner film In Caliente (also known as Viva Señorita).

Plot

The film features the antics of a society of cockroaches in a Mexican café in the absence of its owner. The owner Manuel is reportedly "off to the bullfights".

The film opens with an instrumental of the title song, but interrupts the song with a solo performed by the gondolier cockroach hero. He sings the 1926 John Stepan Zamecnik-Harry D. Kerr composition, "Neapolitan Nights". The title song begins again and is interrupted with a solo by a cockroach parody of Rudy Vallee. He sings the Al Dubin-Harry Warren song, "Sweet Music" from the 1935 Warner Bros. film of the same name,

The scene shifts to a rendition of the title song by a cockroach chorus. They are performing as the background singers to a lady cockroach, who performs as dancer. Her "red velvet gown" consists of a scarlet meat frill. The rest of the film is devoted to the attempts of a parrot to make off with the cockroach heroine. His plans are foiled by the hero.

See also
Looney Tunes and Merrie Melodies filmography (1929–1939)

References

External links
 
Review of the film in Likely Looney, Mostly Merrie.

1935 films
1935 animated films
Animated films about insects
Films scored by Norman Spencer (composer)
Films scored by Bernard B. Brown
Short films directed by Friz Freleng
Films set in Mexico
Merrie Melodies short films
Warner Bros. Cartoons animated short films
1930s Warner Bros. animated short films